This is a list of NGC objects 3001–4000 from the New General Catalogue (NGC). The astronomical catalogue is composed mainly of star clusters, nebulae, and galaxies. Other objects in the catalogue can be found in the other subpages of the list of NGC objects.

The constellation information in these tables is taken from The Complete New General Catalogue and Index Catalogue of Nebulae and Star Clusters by J. L. E. Dreyer, which was accessed using the "VizieR Service". Galaxy types are identified using the NASA/IPAC Extragalactic Database. Other data are from the SIMBAD Astronomical Database unless otherwise stated.

3001–3100

3101–3200

3201–3300

3301–3400

3401–3500

3501–3600

3601–3700

3701–3800

3801–3900

3901–4000

See also
 Lists of astronomical objects

References

 4
NGC objects 3001-4000